Romano Louis "Ron" Mazzoli (November 2, 1932 – November 1, 2022) was an American politician and lawyer from Kentucky.

He represented Louisville, Kentucky, and its suburbs in the United States House of Representatives from 1971 through 1995 as a Democrat. He was the primary architect, with Senator Alan Simpson, of major immigration reform legislation.

Early life and career
Mazzoli, whose father immigrated to the United States from northern Italy, was born in Louisville and was a 1950 graduate of St. Xavier High School, a Xaverian Brothers boys preparatory school. He won the 1950 Kentucky boys high school doubles tennis championship with fellow St. Xavier 1951 alumni George D. Koper.  He graduated magna cum laude from the University of Notre Dame in Notre Dame, Indiana, in 1954 and from the University of Louisville law school, first in his class, in 1960. Mazzoli served in the Kentucky Senate from 1968 through 1970. In 1969, he ran for mayor of Louisville, and came third in the Democratic primary.

U.S. House of Representatives
Mazzoli was elected to the U.S. House of Representatives in 1970, defeating Republican incumbent William Cowger by 211 votes, the closest House election of that year. Serving for the next 24 years, he was Chairman of the House of Representatives' Immigration, International Law and Refugees Subcommittee for twelve years. He also served on the Small Business, Intelligence and District of Columbia Committees.

In 1981, Mazzoli, an anti-abortion Democrat, introduced, along with Republican Henry Hyde, the Human Life Amendment, a proposed constitutional amendment which would ban all abortions by granting legal protection to all unborn children in the United States. Ultimately, the amendment failed to amass the 218 votes necessary to pass.

Mazzoli authored the Simpson-Mazzoli Immigration Reform and Control Act, later known as the Immigration Reform and Control Act of 1986, and cosponsored it with Republican Senator Alan K. Simpson. The bill enacted the first U.S. laws to sanction employers who hired undocumented aliens; it also granted an amnesty for aliens already living and working in the United States. After five years of debate and compromise, the Simpson-Mazzoli Bill was ultimately signed into law in November 1986. Also in 1986, Mazzoli  was one of the House impeachment managers who prosecuted the case in the impeachment trial of Judge Harry E. Claiborne. Claiborne was found guilty by the United States Senate and removed from his federal judgeship.

Mazzoli did not run for reelection in 1994, leaving office in January 1995. The 104th United States Congress, the first in nearly a quarter century without Mazzoli, passed legislation (P.L 104–77), signed by President Bill Clinton on December 28, 1995, renaming the Federal Building in his hometown of Louisville, the Romano L. Mazzoli Federal Building.

Later life
After leaving Congress, he taught at Bellarmine University and was the Ralph S. Petrilli Distinguished Visiting Professor of Law at the University of Louisville Law School for the Fall 1995 semester, returning later to the law school as faculty.

In 2002, Mazzoli was a Fellow at the Institute of Politics at Harvard University's John F. Kennedy School of Government. He graduated with a Masters in Public Administration from Harvard's Kennedy School of Government in June 2004. While studying for his degree, he lived on campus, where he met Pete Buttigieg, then an undergraduate student. In 2012, Mazzoli officiated Buttigieg's inauguration as mayor of South Bend, Indiana.

In September 2006, Simpson and Mazzoli co-authored an article that appeared in The Washington Post revisiting their 1986 immigration legislation.

Personal life and death
Mazzoli married Helen Dillon in 1959. They had two children and remained together until her death in 2012.

Mazzoli died at his home in Louisville on November 1, 2022, one day before his 90th birthday.

Election results

References

External links

September 2006 article, co-authored with Alan Simpson, revisiting their 1986 immigration reform legislation in the current political climate
Romano L. Mazzoli Oral History Collection, University Archives and Records Center, University of Louisville, Louisville, Kentucky
Romano L. Mazzoli Papers, 1920s - 2010, University Archives and Records Center, University of Louisville, Louisville, Kentucky

1932 births
2022 deaths
20th-century American lawyers
20th-century American politicians
American people of Italian descent
Bellarmine University faculty
Democratic Party members of the United States House of Representatives from Kentucky
Harvard Kennedy School alumni
Harvard Kennedy School staff
Kentucky lawyers
Democratic Party Kentucky state senators
Democratic Party members of the Kentucky House of Representatives
Military personnel from Louisville, Kentucky
Politicians from Louisville, Kentucky
University of Louisville School of Law alumni
University of Notre Dame alumni